The CMLL World Light Heavyweight Championship (Campeonato Mundial Semi Completo de CMLL in Spanish) is a singles professional wrestling world championship promoted by Consejo Mundial de Lucha Libre (CMLL) since 1991. As it is a professional wrestling championship, it is not won legitimately: it is instead won via a scripted ending to a match or awarded to a wrestler because of a storyline. Because Lucha Libre emphasizes the lower weight classes, this division is considered more important than the normally more prestigious heavyweight division of a promotion. All title matches take place under two out of three falls rules.

The current, reigning, CMLL World Light Heavyweight Champion is Niebla Roja who won the championship on June 10, 2017. The first champion to be recognized by CMLL was Jerry Estrada, who defeated Pierroth Jr. in the finals of a 16-man tournament that took place between September 15 and September 26, 1991. Overall, there have been fifteen reigns shared among fourteen wrestlers. Dr. Wagner Jr. and Atlantis are the only two wrestlers to have held the title twice; Dr. Wagner Jr. is listed as an unofficial three-time champion, but he is not recognized as such by CMLL. Jerry Estrada's 175 da reign is currently the shortest reign in history, while [Niebla Roja jr.]] Currently holds the récord for his ongoing first longest reign, at 1, 889+ days. Aquarius' unofficial title reign is the shortest on record, 8 days, but is not acknowledged by CMLL.

Title history

Combined reigns

Footnotes

References
General source
[G] -
Specific sources

External links
 CMLL World Light Heavyweight Championship

Consejo Mundial de Lucha Libre championships
Light heavyweight wrestling championships
CMLL World Light Heavyweight Championship